Hradčany-Kobeřice is a municipality in Prostějov District in the Olomouc Region of the Czech Republic. It has about 400 inhabitants.

Administrative parts
The municipality is made up of villages of Hradčany and Kobeřice.

References

Villages in Prostějov District